Hesamabad, also rendered as Hisamabad, may refer to:

Hesamabad, Fars
Hesamabad, Asadabad, Hamadan Province
Hesamabad, Famenin, Hamadan Province
Hesamabad, Khuzestan
Hesamabad, Markazi
Hesamabad, Qazvin
Hesamabad, Zanjan